Tsuko may refer to:
 6599 Tsuko a main-belt asteroid named after Tsuko Nakamura (b. 1943)
 Tsuko Nakamura (born 1943), Japanese astronomer and discoverer of minor planets
 Tsūkō ichiran, a compilation of Japanese documents about foreign relations
 Tsuko Station a Japanese train station located in Ogōri, Fukuoka